Cumbal is a stratovolcano of the Caribe Terrane, located at the Nudo de los Pastos in Nariño, Colombia. It is the southernmost historically active volcano of Colombia and is together with Chiles and Azufral one of the few volcanoes of the Western Ranges. The volcano is dominated by andesites.

Plane crash 
The volcano was the crash site of TAME Flight 120, which struck one of its sides while in a go-around approach to Tulcán on January 28, 2002. There were no survivors among the 94 occupants.

Gallery

See also 
 List of volcanoes in Colombia
 List of volcanoes by elevation

References

Bibliography

External links 
 

Andean Volcanic Belt
Mountains of Colombia
Stratovolcanoes of Colombia
Quaternary South America
Quaternary volcanoes
20th-century volcanic events
Active volcanoes
Geography of Nariño Department
Four-thousanders of the Andes